Lungowe v. Vedanta Resources plc [2019] UKSC 20 is a UK company law and English tort law case, concerning business liability for human rights violations, environmental damage and the duty of care owed by a parent company.

Facts
From Chingola in Zambia's copperbelt region, lead claimant Dominic Liswaniso Lungowe and another 1,825 Zambian citizens  claimed that Vedanta Resources plc had breached its duty of care to ensure that its Zambian subsidiary, Konkola Copper Mines Plc, ("KCM") would not harm the environment and local communities. They claimed compensation for personal injury, property damage, loss of income, amenity and enjoyment of land because of copper mine discharges. Vedanta plc argued the English court did not have jurisdiction to hear the claim and should stay proceedings on forum non conveniens grounds. It argued there was an abuse of EU law.

Judgments

High Court
By an order dated 16 June 2016, issued following judgment on 27 May 2016, Peter Coulson, then a High Court judge, granted jurisdiction over the claims: the case could not be fairly pursued in Zambia. Forum non conveniens, after the case of Owusu was irrelevant under the Brussels Regulation (EU) 1215/2012 article 4. He rejected the argument that there was an abuse of EU law. To show abuse, the sole object of litigation had to be to oust another court’s jurisdiction, or that the claim was fraudulent. There was legitimate concern that the parent company was the architect of the environmental pollution, and that the Zambian company had no ability to pay. The claim had a real prospect of success in holding the parent owed a duty of care: by establishing foreseeability, proximity and reasonableness under the three-fold test for the duty of care laid down in Caparo plc v Dickman. A claim in negligence could arise from the subsidiary’s operations, according to Chandler v Cape plc. Former employees were more likely to succeed, but residents have an arguable case, both in English and Zambian law, considering Erste Group Bank AG (London) v JSC (VMZ Red October). Claims against both defendants (the parent and subsidiary company) were closely bound together. The Zambian company was a necessary and proper party to the claim against the parent company. England was an appropriate place to try the claims. Also, ‘if these claimants pursued KCM in Zambia, they would not obtain justice’. If it had been necessary, the court would have exercised discretion to allow service out of the jurisdiction on the Zambian company.

Court of Appeal
The Court of Appeal confirmed by a ruling issued on 13 October 2017 that Vedanta could be sued in England, and that the claimants' case in tort had a reasonable prospect of success.

Supreme Court
In its judgment delivered on 10 April 2019, the Supreme Court unanimously held that Vedanta Resources plc could be sued in England, applying Zambian law although this was agreed to share similar principles to English tort law. There was an arguable case that Vedanta Resources plc, as the parent company, had assumed responsibility or had a duty of care towards the claimants who were harmed by Vedanta's subsidiaries.

Lord Briggs gave the following decision, concerning the duty of care.

See also

English tort law
UK company law

References

English tort case law
2019 in case law
Supreme Court of the United Kingdom cases
Copper mining in Africa
Copperbelt Province
United Kingdom–Zambia relations
Vedanta Resources